Gra

The list of tallest buildings in Slovenia ranks buildings in Slovenia by official height. The tallest building in Slovenia is currently the 89 m (292 ft) high Crystal Palace in Ljubljana, which stands 20 stories high. The tallest non-building structure in Slovenia is Trbovlje Chimney with a height of 364 metres.

Tallest buildings

This list ranks Slovenia's buildings that stand at least . Data source is emporis.com, unless otherwise noted.

Tallest proposed
Data source is emporis.com, unless otherwise noted.

Currently under construction

See also
 List of tallest buildings in Balkans

References

External links
Slovenia Page on Emporis.com
Diagram of Slovenia Buildings on SkyscraperPage

Slovenia
Tallest

Slovenia